Amy Frazier was the defending champion but did not compete that year.

Conchita Martínez won in the final 4–6, 6–1, 6–3 against Chanda Rubin.

Seeds
A champion seed is indicated in bold text while text in italics indicates the round in which that seed was eliminated. All sixteen seeds received a bye to the second round.

  Arantxa Sánchez Vicario (semifinals)
  Conchita Martínez (champion)
  Gabriela Sabatini (quarterfinals)
  Lindsay Davenport (quarterfinals)
  Anke Huber (quarterfinals)
  Natasha Zvereva (quarterfinals)
  Mary Joe Fernández (second round)
  Naoko Sawamatsu (second round)
  Nathalie Tauziat (third round)
  Chanda Rubin (final)
  Lisa Raymond (second round)
  Amanda Coetzer (third round)
 n/a
  Karina Habšudová (third round)
  Julie Halard (third round)
  Sabine Appelmans (third round)

Draw

Finals

Top half

Section 1

Section 2

Bottom half

Section 3

Section 4

References
 1995 Acura Classic Draw

LA Women's Tennis Championships
1995 WTA Tour